Urocaridella cyrtorhyncha is a species of shrimp in the family Palaemonidae. The species is similar to U. urocaridella, U. antonbruunii, and U. pulchella. The species is found in the Indian and Pacific Oceans, including the Red Sea.

References

Palaemonidae
Crustaceans of the Indian Ocean
Crustaceans of the Pacific Ocean
Crustaceans described in 1969